Kevin Norwood (born September 23, 1989) is a former American football wide receiver. He was drafted by the Seattle Seahawks in the fourth round of the 2014 NFL Draft. He played college football at Alabama.

Early years
Norwood was born and raised in Biloxi, Mississippi and has three brothers and one sister. He was ranked as the 69th overall prospect by the Mobile Press-Register's Super Southeast 120.  He was member of the Orlando Sentinel All-Southern team in high school. He was named as the Sun Herald's South Mississippi Defensive Player of the Year. He was selected as Mr. South Mississippi Football. He was ranked as the 44th wide receiver prospect by scout.com. He was selected to the first-team All-State by the Jackson Clarion-Ledger.

College career
Norwood attended the University of Alabama from 2009 to 2013. He finished his career with a total of 81 receptions for 1,275 yards and 12 touchdowns. He also won three BCS National Championships with the Crimson Tide.

Professional career

Seattle Seahawks
Norwood was drafted by the Seattle Seahawks with the 123rd pick in the fourth round of the 2014 NFL Draft.

Carolina Panthers
Norwood was traded to the Carolina Panthers on August 30, 2015.

On February 7, 2016, Norwood's Panthers played in Super Bowl 50. He was inactive for the game, which saw the Panthers fall to the Denver Broncos by a score of 24–10.

On September 3, 2016, Norwood was placed on injured reserve.

Norwood was released on September 30, 2016.

San Diego Chargers
On October 4, 2016, Norwood was signed to the Chargers' practice squad. He was released on November 1, 2016.

New York Giants
On November 9, 2016, Norwood was signed to the Giants' practice squad. He signed a reserve/future contract with the Giants on January 9, 2017.

On August 14, 2017, Norwood was waived/injured by the Giants with a hip injury and placed on injured reserve. He was released with an injury settlement on November 22, 2017.

References

External links
Alabama Crimson Tide bio

1989 births
Living people
Alabama Crimson Tide football players
Seattle Seahawks players
Carolina Panthers players
San Diego Chargers players
New York Giants players
American football wide receivers
Sportspeople from Biloxi, Mississippi
Players of American football from Mississippi
People from D'Iberville, Mississippi